South Ealing tube station is a London Underground station in the London Borough of Ealing. The station is on the Heathrow Airport branch of the Piccadilly line, between Acton Town and Northfields stations. It is located on South Ealing Road and is in Travelcard Zone 3.

Station information
South Ealing tube station has a waiting room.

The station does not offer step-free access from the train or platform to street level.

Like all other London Underground stations, South Ealing has a Labyrinth artwork by Mark Wallinger, in place since 2013.

Connections
London Buses route 65 and night route N65 serve the station.

History
South Ealing station was opened as a stop on the District Railway (later the District line) on 1 May 1883. These trains were initially steam-powered, but the line has been electrified since 1905.

The station has been served by the Piccadilly line since 29 April 1935. It was modernised between 1935 and 1936, with the original buildings replaced, the eastbound platform receiving a new concrete canopy and waiting room and electric lights being installed.

The District line service was withdrawn in 1964.

The station building was again replaced in 1983. It was refurbished once more in 2006.

Gallery

References

External links

 
 
 

Piccadilly line stations
London Underground Night Tube stations
Tube stations in the London Borough of Ealing
Former Metropolitan District Railway stations
Railway stations in Great Britain opened in 1883